James Bowstead (1801–1843) was an Anglican clergyman who served in the Church of England as the Bishop of Sodor and Man (1838–1840) and Bishop of Lichfield (1840–1843).

Born in Great Salkeld on 1 May 1801, he was educated at Bampton grammar school and Corpus Christi College, Cambridge, where he graduated with a Bachelor of Arts in 1824 and a Doctorate of Divinity in 1834. He was a Fellow of Corpus Christi College, Cambridge (1824–1838) and also a tutor at the college (1832–1838). During that period, he was ordained a priest in the Anglican ministry in 1827 and became Rector of Rettendon, Essex in 1837.

He was nominated Bishop of Sodor and Man by Queen Victoria on 13 July 1838 and was consecrated by Archbishop William Howley of Canterbury on 22 July 1838. Eighteen months later, he was translated to the bishopric of Lichfield on 23 January 1840.

He died in office at Clifton, Bristol on 11 October 1843, aged 42.

References

Bibliography

 
 
 

 
 
 
 

 
 
 

1801 births
1843 deaths
19th-century Church of England bishops
Bishops of Sodor and Man
Bishops of Lichfield
Alumni of Corpus Christi College, Cambridge
Fellows of Corpus Christi College, Cambridge
People from Great Salkeld